Meghan McPeak is a Canadian basketball play-by-play broadcaster, currently calling games for the Washington Wizards of the NBA. She previously called games for the Washington Mystics of the WNBA and the Capital City Go-Go of the NBA G League. She became the first female broadcaster to call an NBA game in over 30 years when she called a pre-season Washington Wizards game in October 2018.

Career 
McPeak studied radio broadcasting at Humber College in Toronto, while playing as a point guard on the college's women's basketball team.

In 2015, she became the first female play-by-play broadcaster in the NBA G-League when she was hired by the Raptors 905. With the Raptors, she also hosted pre-game and post-game shows for the NBA team. In 2018, she was hired by the Washington Wizards to call games for their G-League affiliate, the Capital City Go-Go.

In 2022, she joined CBS Sports as a play-by-play announcer for college football.

See also 
 List of current Women's National Basketball Association broadcasters

References

Living people
Canadian sports announcers
Women sports journalists
Humber College alumni
Year of birth missing (living people)